YMCA SCUBA Program (also known as Y-SCUBA) was an underwater diving training program operated by YMCA of the USA from 1959 to 2008. It was the first nationally organised underwater diving instruction program offered in the United States of America. A program with a similar content is now delivered by Scuba Educators International, an organisation founded by a group of former senior YMCA SCUBA instructors in 2008.

Origins
In 1954, YMCA of the US and other interested parties under the auspices of the Council for National Cooperation in Aquatics commenced a study to look at the safety aspects of underwater diving. Findings of the study were outlined with the view of creating a course of training sufficient to produce ‘capable performance in those who elect to participate in… recreational (diving) activity’. A trial course was run during the late 1954 and early 1955 by YMCA of the USA using this outline. The material used in the course was then published in The Science of Skin and SCUBA Diving (or The New Science of Skin and SCUBA Diving as some sources suggest) during 1957. YMCA of the USA then developed its own program of underwater diving instruction for delivery as part of its existing aquatics program. It certified its first snorkelling and scuba diving instructors in August 1959, thereby becoming the first nationally organized underwater diving training program offered in the US.

Winding up
In July 2008, YMCA of the USA announced that the scuba program would cease on December 31, 2008 and that it would continue to replace lost certificate cards for training conducted from 1984 to 2008. In 2008, a group of former YMCA SCUBA instructors created a new organisation called Scuba Educators International (SEI) for the purpose of continuing YMCA SCUBA diver training program under a new banner.

Recognition
In 1980, YMCA SCUBA joined CMAS, thereby gaining access to CMAS International Diver Training Certificates for its divers and instructors. YMCA SCUBA was a member of the Recreational Scuba Training Council (RSTC) from its foundation in 1986 until 2008.

Qualifications
At the time of closure, YMCA SCUBA's qualification system was structured as follows.

Snorkel
 Snorkeling
 Skin Diver

Scuba
 Dive Refreshed
 Open Water Diver 
 Open Water II Diver
 Advanced Open Water
 Silver Advanced Diver 
 Gold Master Diver

Leadership
 Skin Diving Instructor
 Divemaster 
 Assistant Instructor
 Silver Instructor
 Gold Instructor
 Platinum Instructor 
 Instructor Trainer 

Specialities
 Aquatic Environmentalist
 Boat Diver
 Cavern Diver
 Computer Assisted Diver
 Dry Suit Diver
 Equipment Service
 Ice Diver
 Night Diver
 Nitrox Diver

Specialities continued
 Oxygen Provider
 Public Safety Diver
 Reef Ecology
 Research Diver
 Search and Recovery
 SLAM (Scuba Lifesaving & Accident Management) Rescue
 Underwater Archaeology
 Underwater Navigation
 Underwater Photographer
 Wreck Diver

CMAS equivalencies 
The following equivalencies were those in place as of December 2004.

References

External links
 http://www.ymca.net/scuba (website as of late 2008)

Scuba
Underwater diving training organizations
1959 establishments in the United States
2008 disestablishments in the United States